East Ravendale is a small village and civil parish in North East Lincolnshire, England.

The village has a small school, a church, approximately twenty houses, and a postbox.

Both East Ravendale Primary School and the neighbouring Grade II listed St Martin's Church were designed by architect James Fowler in 1857, and were his first new-build school with church.

Three other buildings in the village are listed: early 18th-century East Ravendale Hall, 19th-century Parkside farmhouse, and 17th-century thatched cottages.

References

External links

"Ravendale", genuki.org.uk. Retrieved 24 July 2011

Borough of North East Lincolnshire
Villages in Lincolnshire
Civil parishes in Lincolnshire